This article lists the confirmed squads lists for badminton's 2017 Sudirman Cup.

Group 1A

China

Thailand

Hong Kong

Group 1B

Korea

Chinese Taipei

Russia

Group 1C

Japan

Malaysia

Germany

Group 1D

Denmark

Indonesia

India

References

2017